National Highway 753E, commonly referred to as NH 753E is a national highway in  India. It is a spur road of National Highway 53. NH-753E traverses the state of Maharashtra in India.

Route 

Ajanta, Buldhana, Khamgaon.

Junctions  

  Terminal near Ajanta.
  near Buldhana.
  Terminal near Khamgaon.

See also 

 List of National Highways in India
 List of National Highways in India by state

References

External links 

 NH 753E on OpenStreetMap

National highways in India
National Highways in Maharashtra